George Gillett may refer to:

George A. Gillett (1877–1956), New Zealand multi-code footballer
George N. Gillett Jr. (born 1938), American businessman, professional sports franchise owner
George Gillett (politician) (1870–1939), Member of Parliament for Finsbury, 1923–1935

See also 
 George F. Gillette, member of the California legislature
"Gorgeous" George Gillette, English professional wrestling manager, manager of Kendo Nagasaki